Radio Parallèle was XM Satellite Radio's French-language  men's talk radio channel, located on XM channel 156. The channel was produced by XM Radio Canada, though the programming, as well as the near-totality of the shows aired, were done from the Radio Pirate.com studios out of Quebec City, Quebec, owned by morning-man Jeff Fillion.

After a one-season hiatus in 2009-2010, live French-language broadcasts of the Montreal Canadiens (both home and away) games are back on this channel. The regular programming is then suspended to air the matches, from CKAC's feed. On August 15, 2011, this channel was replaced by Voices Radio, a coast-to-coast showcase of Canadian music of various styles.

Franc Parler (November 17, 2005-April 16, 2006)
The French-language channel debuted as Franc Parler on XM Satellite Radio (It was an XM Radio Canada startup offering. XM Canada stations also air on XM's main USA service). Franc Parler began as a men's lifestyle and sports talk channel. It soon evolved into a sports format and the channel was renamed SportsPlus to reflect the obvious.

SportPlus (April 17, 2006-April 8, 2007)

SportsPlus added a new dimension when it began airing the French over-the-air broadcasts of National Hockey League play-by-play of the Montreal Canadiens games from flagship station CKAC in Montreal. (XM Radio owns the rights to broadcast National Hockey League games and had already been airing most Canadiens games in English within the NHL XM channel range. XM Canada/SportsPlus actually had made an unsuccessful bid to be the flagship station to grab exclusive radio rights to the Canadiens.)

XM172 quickly developed into full-time sports talk format, with original programming of three programs: a morning, noon, and afternoon show, as well as some original weekend programs. It continued to evolve and later added a live show to wrap around Canadien nighttime hockey games. That show, aired live until midnight Eastern time and would take phone calls emanating from Canada and the U.S. Former Canadiens player Benoît Brunet became a primary hockey analyst for the station.  Additionally, more live sports were added, including QUFL, & USL, as well as the Ottawa Senators NHL French broadcasts.

On August 11, 2006, XM signed controversial shock jock Jeff Fillion, formerly involved in the CHOI-FM license renewal controversy, to host a daily morning program on SportPlus. His show, who was already on air on his internet radio station before being contracted by XM Radio Canada, was the only one aired from Quebec City, while the rest of the programming was produced from the XM Radio Canada studios in Montréal.

However, due to budget issues, XM Radio Canada decided, on March 22, 2007, to release the sporting staff at SportPlus. The station was then rebranded as Radio Parallèle.

Radio Parralèle (April 9, 2007-August 11, 2011)

Lists of shows aired
 Le Doom Show, with Dominique Dumas
 Jeff Le Pirate, with Jeff Fillion, Yves Landry, and others
 Yves Landry, by Yves Landry himself
 Le p’tit monde scientifique du Doc Boucher, with Dr. Denis Boucher
 Ypotek, with Stéphane Bruyère
 Virage XM, with Daniel Boudreault and Jacques Bienvenue
 Radio Haute Résolution, with "Steve The Geek" Tremblay, Émile Gauthier and Sébastien "topsebas" Lévesque
 The Warmup, with "Dany Calgary" Lemieux, and others (from Calgary, Alberta)
 Truck Stop Québec, with Benoît Therrien, and others
 Le Terrain de Jeux de Pascal, with Pascal "Pace" Déry, Éric "Rick" Gagné and Pascal Leblanc (split from the Radio Pirate.com studios in Quebec City, Quebec and Déry's own studios, in Longueuil, Quebec)
 Hugocentrik, with Hugo Clermont, and others
 Le P en Liberté, with Pierre-Yves "Le P" Blais, and others
 Connaître la suite, with Steve Martineau, and others

References

External links
 Radio Parallèle on XM Canada site
 Radio Parallèle on XM Canada site 
 SportPlus XM Commercial 

XM Satellite Radio channels
Digital-only radio stations
News and talk radio stations in Canada
Satellite radio stations in Canada
French-language radio stations in Canada
Radio stations established in 2005
Radio stations disestablished in 2011
Defunct radio stations in Canada